Kara language may refer to:

 Kara language (Korea), a language of the Gaya confederacy in southern Korea
 Kara language (Papua New Guinea), an Austronesian language spoken in the Kavieng District, Papua New Guinea
 Kara language (Tanzania), a Bantu language spoken by the Kara people of Tanzania
 Kara languages, a group of languages spoken in the Central African Republic
 Kara or Tar Gula language
 Kara or Fer language, spoken in the Central African Republic
 Kàrà, a dialect of the Northwest Gbaya language, spoken in Cameroon and the Central African Republic
 Caranqui language, also spelled Cara or Kara, an extinct language of Ecuador

See also
 Karo language (disambiguation)
 Qwara language, a western Agaw dialect spoken in Ethiopia
 Kara (disambiguation)